Guido Meregalli (1894 – 1959) was an Italian racecar driver, known from several GP victories between 1920 and 1926.

He had victories in the 1920 Grand Prix season, winning  the Targa Florio 1920 in a 4441 cm³ Nazzaro GP.
Driving a Diatto alongside Alfieri Maserati, he won the Circuito del Garda race three years in a row,
the 1922 Grand Prix season in a Tipo 20 (two-litre, four-cylinder),
1923 and 
1924 in a Tipo 20S.  At the VI Coppa Florio 1922, he was leading the
Diatto GP305 when it  crashed, killing his mechanic Giuseppe Giacchino.  The immediate follower, Henry Segrave gave first aid and helped out.
Switching to Maserati, Meregalli failed to finish in the
1926 Italian Grand Prix, driving a Tipo 26 (1.5-litre, eight-cylinder).

References

Italian racing drivers
Grand Prix drivers
1894 births
1959 deaths